Christophe Ott  (born 7 April 1983 in Luxeuil-les-Bains) is a retired French footballer who played as a goalkeeper. He is currently the assistant manager of EA Guingamp.

Career
A product of Niort's youth football teams, Ott became a professional with the senior side, and made two appearances in the French Ligue 2.

In 2010, Ott went on a week-long trial with English League One club Yeovil Town.

Coaching career
From June 2012 to June 2014, Ott worked as a youth coach for AS Poissy's U12 squad and later as a youth goalkeeper coach for Athletic Club de Boulogne-Billancourt from June 2015 to June 2016.

He then accepted to helping Patrice Lair, coaching the goalkeepers of Paris Saint-Germain Féminine. Ott also became a goalkeeping coach, and was appointed assistant to Niort's manager Patrice Lair in July 2018.

Ott followed Patrice Lair to EA Guingamp, acting as his assistant coach this time and not just goalkeeper coach. However, Lair was fired on 23 September 2019 but Ott stayed at the club as assistant manager of the caretaker manager Sylvain Didot, who later was given the job officially.

Honours
Chamois Niortais

 Championnat National champions: 2005–06

References

1983 births
Living people
People from Luxeuil-les-Bains
French footballers
Association football goalkeepers
Chamois Niortais F.C. players
Pau FC players
Ionikos F.C. players
APEP FC players
FC Martigues players
AS Poissy players
Ligue 2 players
Championnat National players
Cypriot First Division players
French expatriate footballers
Expatriate footballers in Greece
Expatriate footballers in Cyprus
Sportspeople from Haute-Saône
Footballers from Bourgogne-Franche-Comté
French expatriate sportspeople in Greece
French expatriate sportspeople in Cyprus